Huaxiagnathus is a genus of theropod dinosaur from the Lower Cretaceous of China.

The name Huaxiagnathus is derived from the Chinese Hua Xia, 華夏, a traditional word for "China", and from the Greek gnathos, Latinised into gnathus, meaning "jaw."

Description

 
The holotype (CAGS-IG-02-301, Chinese Academy of Geological Sciences, Beijing) specimen was collected from the Yixian Formation (Jehol Group, Aptian) at Dabangou Village, Sihetun area, near Beipiao City, in western Liaoning Province. The holotype consists of an essentially complete skeleton, lacking only the end of the tail, preserved on five large slabs. Partially digested bones of an unidentified vertebrate were found within the holotype specimen. Another, larger specimen of Huaxiagnathus was discovered earlier in the Yixian Formation of the Sihetun area (NGMC 98-5-003, National Geological Museum of China, Beijing), but damage and mistakes made during its preparation rendered it unsuitable as a holotype.

Cladistic analysis indicates that Huaxiagnathus is the basal most known compsognathid, as indicated by its unspecialized forearm.

Hwang et al. (2004, pp. 14–15) diagnosed this genus as follows: differing from all other known compsognathids in having a very long posterior process of the premaxilla that overlaps the antorbital fossa, a manus equal to the combined lengths of the humerus and radius, large manual unguals I and II which are subequal in length and 167% the length of manual ungual III, a first metacarpal which has a smaller proximal transverse width than the second metacarpal, and the presence of a reduced olecranon process on the ulna.

References

Compsognathids
Early Cretaceous dinosaurs of Asia
Yixian fauna
Cretaceous China
Fossil taxa described in 2004
Taxa named by Mark Norell